Boukadir District is a district of Chlef Province, Algeria.

Communes 
The district is further divided into 3 communes:

 Boukadir
 Oued Sly
Sobha

References 

Districts of Chlef Province